William Herbert Newton-Smith (born  May 25, 1943) is a Canadian philosopher of science.

Biography
Newton-Smith's undergraduate degree from Queen's University was in Mathematics and Philosophy, in 1966. He took an MA from Cornell University in Philosophy, in 1968, and a DPhil in philosophy from Balliol College, Oxford, in 1974.  His working life before retirement was mainly as a Fellow of Balliol.

Newton-Smith's 1980 book The Structure of Time is on the philosophy of time.

He led Central European University from its foundation in 1991 until Alfred Stepan was elected rector in 1993.

In 2003, Newton-Smith and his wife Nancy Durham became the first to grow lavender on a field scale in Wales.  They are now the sole distillers of lavender oil in Wales. Their company, Welsh Lavender Ltd, produces face and body creams.

Works

The Structure of Time (1980)
The Rationality of Science (1981)
Logic (1984)
Modelling the Mind (1990) editor with K. V. Wilkes
Popper in China (1992) editor with J. Tianji
Chapter 1 - Popper, ciência e racionalidade. In Karl Popper: Filosofia e problemas (1997), organized by Anthony O'Hear, translated to Portuguese by Luiz Paulo Rouanet. Editora Unesp. Cambridge University Press.
The Companion to the Philosophy of Science  (2000)

References

External links
 Welsh Lavender

1943 births
Living people
Central European University
Cornell University alumni
Fellows of Balliol College, Oxford
Philosophers of science
Philosophers of time